This list of annual events in metropolitan Copenhagen is a list of festivals and other annual events in metropolitan Copenhagen, Denmark.

Music

Gallery

References

External links
 Event catalogue 2014–17

 
Copenhagen
Copenhagen-related lists
Copenhagen